Joseph Pearson (born 1868) was an English footballer who played as a midfielder. Pearson did not make his league debut until his second season (1889–90) at Bolton Wanderers. However, he was selected to play left-half in their 3 FA Cup ties in the 1888–1889 season. In the first 2 ties against Hurst and West Manchester, Pearson was part of a midfield that helped to achieve 2 clean-sheets, but Bolton were unable to score as both games ended 0–0. However, on 17 November 1888. Pearson and his team were well beaten by Irish club, Linfield Athletic, with the final score being 4–0 to Linfield. He played one league match for Liverpool on 3 September 1892 against Higher Walton in the 1892–93 season.

References

1868 births
English footballers
Bolton Wanderers F.C. players
Liverpool F.C. players
Year of death missing
Association football midfielders